Pseudocellus is an arachnid genus in the order Ricinulei, first described by Norman Platnick in 1980. It is native to the Neotropics.

Species 
 it contains forty-one species:
 Pseudocellus abeli Armas, 2017 — Cuba
 Pseudocellus alux Armas & Agreda, 2016 — Guatemala
 Pseudocellus aridus Teruel, 2015 — Cuba
 Pseudocellus bifer Teruel, 2018 — Cuba
 Pseudocellus barberi (Ewing, 1929) — Guatemala, Honduras (nomen dubium)
 Pseudocellus blesti (Merrett, 1960) — Panama
 Pseudocellus bolivari Gertsch, 1971 — Mexico
 Pseudocellus boneti (Bolívar y Pieltain, 1942) — Mexico
 Pseudocellus chankin Valdez-Mondragón & Francke, 2011 — Mexico
 Pseudocellus cookei (Gertsch, 1977) — Guatemala
 Pseudocellus cruzlopezi Valdez-Mondragón & Francke, 2013 — Mexico
 Pseudocellus cubanicus (Dumitresco & Juvara-balş, 1973) — Cuba
 Pseudocellus dissimilior Teruel, 2018 — Cuba
 Pseudocellus dissimulans (Cooke & Shadab, 1973) — El Salvador
 Pseudocellus dorotheae (Gertsch & Mulaik, 1939) — US
 Pseudocellus franckei Valdez-Mondragón & Cortez-Roldán, 2020 — Mexico
 Pseudocellus gertschi (Márquez & Conconi, 1974) — Mexico
 Pseudocellus giribeti Valdez-Mondragón & Cortez-Roldán, 2021 — Mexico
 Pseudocellus ignotus Armas, 2017 — Cuba
 Pseudocellus jarocho Valdez-Mondragón & Francke, 2011 — Mexico
 Pseudocellus krejcae Cokendolpher & Enríquez, 2004 — Belize
 Pseudocellus mayari (Armas, 1977) — Cuba
 Pseudocellus mitchelli Gertsch, 1971 — Mexico
 Pseudocellus monjarazi Valdez-Mondragón & Francke, 2013 — Mexico
 Pseudocellus olmeca Valdez-Mondragón, Francke & Botero-Trujillo, 2018 — Mexico
 Pseudocellus osorioi (Bolívar y Pieltain, 1946) — Mexico
 Pseudocellus oztotl Valdez-Mondragón & Francke, 2011 — Mexico
 Pseudocellus pachysoma Teruel & Armas, 2008 — Cuba
 Pseudocellus paradoxus (Cooke, 1972) — Cuba
 Pseudocellus pearsei (Chamberlin & Ivie, 1938) — Mexico
 Pseudocellus pelaezi (Coronado Gutierrez, 1970) — Mexico
 Pseudocellus permagnus Armas, 2017 — Cuba
 Pseudocellus platnicki Valdez-Mondragón & Francke, 2011 — Mexico
 Pseudocellus quetzalcoatl Valdez-Mondragón, Francke & Botero-Trujillo, 2018 — Mexico
 Pseudocellus reddelli (Gertsch, 1971) — Mexico
 Pseudocellus relictus (Chamberlin & Ivie, 1938) — Panama
 Pseudocellus sbordonii (Brignoli, 1974) — Mexico
 Pseudocellus seacus Platnick & Pass, 1982 — Guatemala
 Pseudocellus silvai (Armas, 1977) — Cuba
 Pseudocellus spinotibialis (Goodnight & Goodnight, 1952) — Mexico
 Pseudocellus undatus Armas, 2017 — Cuba
 Pseudocellus valerdii Valdez-Mondragón & Juárez-Sánchez, 2021 — Mexico

References

External links
 

Arachnid genera
Ricinulei
Arthropods of Central America